Moscow City Duma District 23 is one of 45 constituencies in Moscow City Duma. The constituency has covered parts of South-Eastern Moscow since 2014. From 1993-2005 District 23 was based in South-Western Moscow; however, after the number of constituencies was reduced to 15 in 2005, the constituency was eliminated.

Members elected

Election results

2001

|-
! colspan=2 style="background-color:#E9E9E9;text-align:left;vertical-align:top;" |Candidate
! style="background-color:#E9E9E9;text-align:left;vertical-align:top;" |Party
! style="background-color:#E9E9E9;text-align:right;" |Votes
! style="background-color:#E9E9E9;text-align:right;" |%
|-
|style="background-color:"|
|align=left|Yury Popov
|align=left|Independent
|
|32.27%
|-
|style="background-color:"|
|align=left|Oleg Sotnikov
|align=left|Independent
|
|17.51%
|-
|style="background-color:#DD137B"|
|align=left|Vladimir Belyayev
|align=left|Social Democratic Party
|
|9.99%
|-
|style="background-color:"|
|align=left|Nikolay Taranev
|align=left|Independent
|
|9.64%
|-
|style="background-color:"|
|align=left|Aleksandr Kapustin
|align=left|Independent
|
|5.27%
|-
|style="background-color:"|
|align=left|Natalya Obletsova
|align=left|Independent
|
|5.01%
|-
|style="background-color:"|
|align=left|Sergey Novikov
|align=left|Independent
|
|4.35%
|-
|style="background-color:"|
|align=left|Artur Savelov
|align=left|Independent
|
|1.96%
|-
|style="background-color:#000000"|
|colspan=2 |against all
|
|11.33%
|-
| colspan="5" style="background-color:#E9E9E9;"|
|- style="font-weight:bold"
| colspan="3" style="text-align:left;" | Total
| 
| 100%
|-
| colspan="5" style="background-color:#E9E9E9;"|
|- style="font-weight:bold"
| colspan="4" |Source:
|
|}

2014

|-
! colspan=2 style="background-color:#E9E9E9;text-align:left;vertical-align:top;" |Candidate
! style="background-color:#E9E9E9;text-align:left;vertical-align:top;" |Party
! style="background-color:#E9E9E9;text-align:right;" |Votes
! style="background-color:#E9E9E9;text-align:right;" |%
|-
|style="background-color:"|
|align=left|Vladimir Platonov
|align=left|United Russia
|
|48.62%
|-
|style="background-color:"|
|align=left|Yelena Gulicheva
|align=left|Communist Party
|
|20.32%
|-
|style="background-color:"|
|align=left|Sergey Shishkin
|align=left|A Just Russia
|
|12.53%
|-
|style="background-color:"|
|align=left|Yury Novikov
|align=left|Liberal Democratic Party
|
|8.55%
|-
|style="background-color:"|
|align=left|Yevgeny Prochik
|align=left|Yabloko
|
|6.27%
|-
| colspan="5" style="background-color:#E9E9E9;"|
|- style="font-weight:bold"
| colspan="3" style="text-align:left;" | Total
| 
| 100%
|-
| colspan="5" style="background-color:#E9E9E9;"|
|- style="font-weight:bold"
| colspan="4" |Source:
|
|}

2019

|-
! colspan=2 style="background-color:#E9E9E9;text-align:left;vertical-align:top;" |Candidate
! style="background-color:#E9E9E9;text-align:left;vertical-align:top;" |Party
! style="background-color:#E9E9E9;text-align:right;" |Votes
! style="background-color:#E9E9E9;text-align:right;" |%
|-
|style="background-color:"|
|align=left|Yelena Nikolayeva
|align=left|Independent
|
|40.64%
|-
|style="background-color:"|
|align=left|Yelena Gulicheva
|align=left|Communist Party
|
|36.16%
|-
|style="background-color:"|
|align=left|Georgy Pomerantsev
|align=left|Liberal Democratic Party
|
|9.03%
|-
|style="background-color:"|
|align=left|Anton Bulatov
|align=left|Communists of Russia
|
|7.32%
|-
| colspan="5" style="background-color:#E9E9E9;"|
|- style="font-weight:bold"
| colspan="3" style="text-align:left;" | Total
| 
| 100%
|-
| colspan="5" style="background-color:#E9E9E9;"|
|- style="font-weight:bold"
| colspan="4" |Source:
|
|}

Notes

References

Moscow City Duma districts